The ASEAN–China Free Trade Area (ACFTA) is a free-trade area among the ten member states of the Association of Southeast Asian Nations (ASEAN) and the People's Republic of China.

History 
China first proposed the idea of a free trade area in November 2000. Leaders of ASEAN and China thus decided to explore measures aimed at economic integration within the region In Brunei the following year, they endorsed the establishment of an ASEAN–China Free Trade Area.

The framework agreement was signed on 4 November 2002 in Phnom Penh, Cambodia, by eleven heads of government.: Hassanal Bolkiah (Sultan of Brunei Darussalam), Hun Sen (Prime Minister of Cambodia), Megawati Soekarnoputri (President of Indonesia), Bounnhang Vorachith (Prime Minister of Laos), Mahathir bin Mohamad (Prime Minister of Malaysia), Than Shwe (Prime Minister of Burma), Gloria Macapagal Arroyo (President of the Philippines), Goh Chok Tong (Prime Minister of Singapore), Thaksin Shinawatra (Prime Minister of Thailand), Phan Văn Khải (Prime Minister of Vietnam), Zhu Rongji (Premier of the State Council of the People's Republic of China).

The first stage implied the 6 first signatories who engaged in the elimination of their tariffs on 90% of their products by 2010. Between 2003 and 2008, trade with ASEAN grew from US$59.6 billion to US$192.5 billion. China's transformation into a major economic power in the 21st century has led to an increase of foreign investments in the bamboo network, a network of overseas Chinese businesses operating in the markets of Southeast Asia that share common family and cultural ties. ASEAN members and the People's Republic of China had a combined nominal gross domestic product of approximately US$6 trillion in 2008.

Once the 6 first signatories accomplished their goal by 2010, the CLMV countries (Cambodia, Lao PDR, Myanmar, Vietnam) engaged in the same policy on tariffs, with the same goal to achieve by 2015. In 2010, the ASEAN–China Free Trade Area became the largest free trade area in terms of population and third largest in terms of nominal GDP. It was also the third largest trade volume after the European Economic Area and the North American Free Trade Area.

On 1 January 2010, the average tariff rate on Chinese goods sold in ASEAN countries decreased from 12.8 to 0.6 percent pending implementation of the free trade area by the remaining ASEAN members. Meanwhile, the average tariff rate on ASEAN goods sold in China decreased from 9.8 to 0.1 percent. By 2015, ASEAN's total merchandise trade with China reached $346.5 billion (15.2% of ASEAN's trade), and the ACFTA accelerated the growth of direct investments from China and commercial cooperation.

Description 
Amendments for the framework of the free trade area mostly concerned Vietnam.  These amendments were designed to assist Vietnam lower tariffs and put forth dates as guidelines.

The free trade agreement reduced tariffs on 7,881 product categories, or 90 percent of imported goods, to zero. This reduction took effect in China and the six original members of ASEAN: Brunei, Indonesia, Malaysia, the Philippines, Singapore and Thailand. The remaining four countries were supposed to follow suit in 2015.

Signatories 

Members of the ASEAN have a combined population of more than 650 million. Indonesia accounts for more than 40 percent of the region's population, and its people have voiced the greatest amount of opposition to the agreement.

See also
 ASEAN Free Trade Area
 Chiang Mai Initiative
 Comprehensive Economic Partnership for East Asia
 Economic Cooperation Framework Agreement (between ROC and PRC)
 List of free trade agreements
 ASEAN–India Free Trade Area (AIFTA)
 Bamboo network
 Nanning-Singapore Economic Corridor
 Rules of Origin
 Market access
 Free-trade area
 China and Southeast Asia in the Xi Jinping Era

References

External links
 Documents on the ASEAN–China Free Trade Area
 ASEAN-China Free Trade Area Business Portal
 China's official CAFTA website 
 Xinhua News Agency's CAFTA coverage 
 China Asean Free Trade website 

Trade blocs
Economy of Brunei
Economy of Myanmar
Economy of Cambodia
Economy of Indonesia
Economy of Laos
Economy of Malaysia
Economy of the Philippines
Economy of Singapore
Economy of Thailand
Economy of Vietnam
ASEAN
2010 introductions
Free trade agreements of China
2010 in economics
Free-trade areas
Foreign trade of Singapore